The Big Mama stela is one of a group of steles from the Arco area of northwestern Italy. The stele may be associated with the culture to which Otzi the Iceman is archaeologically linked.

The stele is one of a group of six from the region.

List of Big Mama stela iconography
The iconography of the Big Mama stela is as follows:

 a partial glyph (lower half of a star?) adorns the worn top edge of the stele
 Central vertical archaic dagger at upper center chest
 Necklace arced above dagger
 six horizontal daggers, three-by-three pointed towards chest midline
 archaic pin-(fibula (brooch)-like), (flanked as 4th item above left three daggers)
 two opposed-facing halberds flanking vertical central dagger
 four facing vertical halberds(all six halberds, are either three triangle-bladed, or three rectangle-bladed)
 four-segmented "corded belt", horizontally flanks the lower 4th of the stele's iconography

The seven archaic daggers have semi-circular, buttressed perpendicular handle terminations. The central vertical dagger handle termination is doubly ornamented. The corded belt may symbolize a "broad collar", that represents the 'agricultural field', and mothering and sustenance.

References

The Iceman, Lone Voyager from the Ice Age, National Geographic, 1993, June, pp 36–67.

External links
Article and photo, "Wedge tomb and slab cist"
Photo of stele
(alternate name of "Arco 1 stele", with description)

3rd-millennium BC steles